Franziska Walser (born 23 March 1952) is a German actress. She appeared in more than fifty films since 1976. She is the oldest daughter of writer Martin Walser. Walser is married to actor Edgar Selge.

Selected filmography

References

External links 

1950 births
Living people
German film actresses
German television actresses
20th-century German actresses
21st-century German actresses